Lysiloma latisiliquum, commonly known as false tamarind or wild tamarind, is a species of tree in the family Fabaceae, that is native to southern Florida in the United States, the Bahamas, Cuba, southern Mexico, and Belize. Its wood is sometimes traded as sabicu wood.

References

External links

latisiliquum
Trees of the Southeastern United States
Trees of the Bahamas
Trees of Cuba
Trees of Belize
Trees of Mexico
Trees of the Yucatán Peninsula